Denise Marston-Smith (born 1977) is a female former English field hockey international, who was a member of the England and Great Britain women's field hockey team. She represented England and won a silver medal, at the 1998 Commonwealth Games in Kuala Lumpur. As of 2007 she played for Olton & West Warwickshire Hockey Club.

References

External links
 

1977 births
English female field hockey players
Living people
Olympic field hockey players of Great Britain
British female field hockey players
Field hockey players at the 1998 Commonwealth Games
Field hockey players at the 2000 Summer Olympics
Commonwealth Games silver medallists for England
Team Bath Buccaneers Hockey Club players
Commonwealth Games medallists in field hockey
Medallists at the 1998 Commonwealth Games